Sara Hradecky is a former Canadian Ambassador to Mexico. She was appointed on October 6, 2011, arriving in Mexico in November 2011.

Background 
Born in Trenton, Ontario and raised in Regional Municipality of Waterloo, Hradecky graduated with a Bachelor of Arts in International Affairs, Carleton University, 1981; Master of Arts in International Affairs, Carleton University in 1983 and a Master of Science in Aeronautical Science from Embry-Riddle Aeronautical University, 2004.

Career 
Hradecky was hired by the Department of Foreign Affairs in 1983, working at home and abroad. Her appointments have included Buenos Aires, Belgrade and Tel Aviv. From 1996 to 2000, she served as Canadian Consul-General, Ho Chi Minh City, Vietnam. From 2006 to 2009, Ambassador Hradecky was Head of Mission at the Canadian Embassy, Abu Dhabi in the United Arab Emirates and served as Director of International Financing, and as Director General of International Business Development, Policy and Innovation. From 2009 to 2011, she held the position of Assistant Deputy Minister for the Afghanistan Task Force in the Privy Council Office.  In September 2016, Ms. Hradecky became Canada's High Commissioner to Kenya, presenting her credentials to H. E. President Uhuru Kenyatta on September 7th, 2016; to UNON's Director General H. E. Sahle-Work Zewde on October 31, 2016, to Rwanda's President H. E. Paul Kagame on January 23, 2017; to Somalia's President H.E. Mohamed A. Mohamed on June 6, 2017 and to Uganda's President H. E. Yoweri Museveni on June 13, 2017.

References 

Ambassadors of Canada to Mexico
Carleton University alumni
Embry–Riddle Aeronautical University alumni
People from Quinte West
People from the Regional Municipality of Waterloo
Living people
Year of birth missing (living people)
Canadian women ambassadors
High Commissioners of Canada to Kenya